Madun (also Romanized as Mādūn and Mādoon; also known as Mādūn-e Gowd Bāgh) is a village in Qaleh Asgar Rural District, Lalehzar District, Bardsir County, Kerman Province, Iran. At the 2006 census, its population was 85, in 31 families.

References 

Populated places in Bardsir County